Mário Tito (6 November 1941 – 9 March 1997) was a Brazilian footballer. He played in one match for the Brazil national football team in 1963. He was also part of Brazil's squad for the 1963 South American Championship.

References

External links
 

1941 births
1997 deaths
Brazilian footballers
Brazil international footballers
Association football defenders
Sportspeople from Rio de Janeiro (state)
People from Bom Jardim